Nonhar is a village of Rohtas district, Bihar, India. The village has a population of about 15,000. The village is the origin of the Thora River, an underground river. Nonhar presents the Indian Social Culture.
It is quite a model village. It has a post office, have two temples, two ponds and two - three private schools.

Nonhar is 4 km west of Bikramganj near Dhangain and 1 km south of Surajpura.

References 

Villages in Rohtas district